The Battle of Kalgan was a battle occurring during the off and on mediation of a cease fire between the Kuomintang and the Chinese Communist Party by George Marshall. It was fought in the renamed city of Zhangjiakou, China.

Prelude
Around September 1946, Chiang Kai-shek was prepared to propose another cease fire agreement, as the Nationalist armies were within Kalgan, with the Communists to George Marshall, as long as the Communists agreed to the proposal of the National Assembly. Zhou Enlai responded that the cease fire must occur at once. According to Zhou, if Kalgan falls into the Nationalist hands, there would be a "total national split." Marshall told Chiang that if the attack was called off, Mao Zedong would consider the cease fire and that the Communists would also be willing to join the National Assembly or the coalition of Nationalist and Communist troops.

Chiang knew the strategic location of Kalgan as the "gateway" for both armies movement in and out of northeast China. Its importance was that it helped secure the area south of the Great Wall.

Marshall rejected the idea of the attack on Kalgan and threatened to send a message to President Truman to have himself recalled back to the US. On October 4, Chiang tried to persuade to Marshall that he always have treated him very well and not to leave. Upon hearing that Marshall had indeed sent a radiogram to Washington D.C., Chiang proposed a ten-day truce. Marshall rescinded his decision and stayed.

With a diplomatic package, proposing Communist delegates to the National Assembly and the amalgamation of the Communist armies into the Nationalist armies as suggested by Chiang, and agreed upon by Marshall and Ambassador John Stuart, Zhou rejected it, saying that it was as equivalent to ask the Communists to surrender. Zhou sent a plan to Marshall, which he became "more impatient with Zhou than at any time during the year." Marshall told Zhou that there were no other reason to continue on with the talks.

Battle
On October 10, 1946, General Fu Zuoyi attacked the city of Kalgan. The battle lasted to October 20.

Outcome
Of the 150,000 inhabitants, 50,000 fled with the remnants of the Communist armies. The model city of the Communists was "lies gutted and ghost-like." The retreating Communist army demolished or set fire to parts of the city. Three weeks after the battle, the city was still without running water, electricity, and lines of communication. They also destroyed 52 factories located in the city which "[deprived] families of 3,000 workers of their livelihood." According to TIME coorespondant, Frederick Gruin, the destruction of the city may have been a political mistake and may also have "undermined their own guerrilla potential."

The Communist army lost about 100,000 soldiers in the defense. The Communist armies in northeast China were also cut off from Yan'an.

See also
List of battles of the Chinese Civil War
National Revolutionary Army
History of the People's Liberation Army
Chinese Civil War

References

Conflicts in 1946
Battles of the Chinese Civil War
1946 in China
Military history of Shanxi
History of Zhangjiakou